Rafiabad (also Romanized as Rafī‘ābād; also known as  Rafī‘īābād) is a village in Qaleh-ye Khvajeh Rural District, in the Central District of Andika County, Khuzestan Province, Iran. At the 2006 census, its population was 108, in 23 families.

References 

Populated places in Andika County